is a JR West Geibi station located in Taka-chō, Shōbara, Hiroshima Prefecture, Japan.

The station has one side platform.

History
1987-04-01: Japan National Railways is privatized, and Taka Station became a JR West station

Around the station
The Saijō River is located across Route 183 from Taka Station. Taka Elementary School is located northeast of the station along Route 183.

Highway access
Japan National Route 183
Hiroshima Prefectural Route 232 (Taka Teishajō Route) connects the station to Route 183

Connecting lines
All lines are JR West lines.
Geibi Line
Hirako Station — Taka Station — Bingo-Shōbara Station

External links
 JR West

Geibi Line
Railway stations in Hiroshima Prefecture
Railway stations in Japan opened in 1934
Shōbara, Hiroshima